The South Western Air Command is one of the five operational commands of the Indian Air Force. It was raised in Jodhpur in July 1980 from the No.1 Operations Group of the Western Air Command. Its operations sector includes most of Rajasthan, through Gujarat and Saurashtra, as far south as Kutch and Pune. The SWAC moved to its current headquarters in Gandhinagar in May 1998, and incorporates the Indian airbases of Bhuj, Jaisalmer, Naliya, Jamnagar, Jodhpur, Uttarlai/Barmer and Pune. It controls air operations in the south western air sector, which includes most of Rajasthan, and south through Gujarat to Saurashtra, and Kutch to Pune. It also operates the forward airbases at Ahmedabad, Nal and Suratgarh. The SWAC's role has historically been largely of air defence, although it has been reported to have incorporated a strike profile.

Organisation

Squadrons include:

Air Officer Commanding-in-Chief

References

External links
 Bharat-Rakshak.com, IAF COMMAND STRUCTURE

Commands of the Indian Air Force
Military units and formations established in 1980
Military units and formations of the Indian Air Force
1980 establishments in Rajasthan